Trần Phi Sơn (born 14 March 1992) is a Vietnamese footballer who plays as a winger for V-League club Hồng Lĩnh Hà Tĩnh

Honours

Club
Sông Lam Nghệ An
 Vietnamese Cup: 2017

International
Vietnam U23
 Southeast Asian Games bronze medal: 2015

International career

Vietnam U23

Vietnam
Scores and results list Vietnam's goal tally first.

References 

1992 births
Living people
Vietnamese footballers
Association football midfielders
V.League 1 players
Song Lam Nghe An FC players
People from Hà Tĩnh province
Vietnam international footballers
Footballers at the 2014 Asian Games
Southeast Asian Games bronze medalists for Vietnam
Southeast Asian Games medalists in football
Competitors at the 2015 Southeast Asian Games
Asian Games competitors for Vietnam